Lioptilodes aguilaicus is a species of moth in the genus Lioptilodes known from Argentina. Moths of this species take flight in October and December and have a wingspan of approximately 19-23 millimetres.

References

Platyptiliini
Moths described in 2006
Taxa named by Cees Gielis